Paak may refer to:

 Anderson .Paak, American singer and rapper
 Atka Airport (ICAO: PAAK)

See also
 Pak (disambiguation)